is a Japanese instructor of Shotokan karate.
He has  won the JKA All-Japan championships for kata on 2 occasions and for kumite on 3 occasions.
He is currently an instructor of the Japan Karate Association.

Biography

Kunio Kobayashi was born in Tokyo, Japan on 5 July 1967. He studied at Komazawa University. His karate training began during his 1st year of junior high school.

Competition
Kunio Kobayashi has had considerable success in karate competition.

Major Tournament Success
51st JKA All Japan Karate Championship (2008) - 1st Place Kata
10th Funakoshi Gichin Cup World Karate-do Championship Tournament (Sydney, 2006) - 2nd Place Kata
49th JKA All Japan Karate Championship (2006) - 2nd Place Kata
48th JKA All Japan Karate Championship (2005) - 1st Place Kata
9th Shoto World Cup Karate Championship Tournament (Tokyo, 2004) - 3rd Place Kata
47th JKA All Japan Karate Championship (2004) - 1st Place Kumite; 2nd Place Kata
46th JKA All Japan Karate Championship (2003) - 2nd Place Kata; 3rd Place Kumite
45th JKA All Japan Karate Championship (2002) - 1st Place Kumite; 3rd Place Kata
42nd JKA All Japan Karate Championship (1999) - 1st Place Kumite
41st JKA All Japan Karate Championship (1998) - 3rd Place Kumite
40th JKA All Japan Karate Championship (1997) - 3rd Place Kumite
6th Shoto World Cup Karate Championship Tournament (Osaka, 1996) - 3rd Place Kumite
39th JKA All Japan Karate Championship (1996) - 3rd Place Kumite
4th Shoto World Cup Karate Championship Tournament (Tokyo, 1992) - 3rd Place Kumite
34th JKA All Japan Karate Championship (1991) - 3rd Place Kumite

References

 

1967 births
Japanese male karateka
Karate coaches
Shotokan practitioners
Sportspeople from Tokyo
Komazawa University alumni
Living people
20th-century Japanese people
21st-century Japanese people